Marsilius may refer to

several medieval scholars:

 Marsilius of Padua
 Marsilius of Inghen
 Marsilius Ficinus

as well as

 King Marsile, a character in the medieval heroic poem, The Song of Roland.